EFL most commonly refers to English as a foreign language.

EFL may also refer to:

Sports 
 Eastern Football League (Australia), an Australian rules football league
 Eastern Football League (Scotland), a defunct Scottish football competition 
 Elite Football League of India, an American football league in India, Sri Lanka and Bangladesh
 Empire Football League, a semi-pro American football league
 English Football League, an English football competition
 Enterprise Football League, a Taiwanese football league
 European Football League, a league of clubs affiliated with the European Federation of American Football

Science and technology 
 EFL (programming language)
 35 mm equivalent focal length
 Effective focal length
 Enlightenment Foundation Libraries, a set of graphical software libraries

Other uses 
 Eagle Air (Tanzania), an airline
 Etron Fou Leloublan, a French avant-progressive rock band
 Kefalonia International Airport in Greece

See also 

 EFL Cup, an annual knockout association football competition in men's domestic English football (tier one to tier four)
 EFL Trophy, an annual English association football knock-out competition  (tier three to tier four)
 
 Eastern Football League (disambiguation)
 Extreme Football League (disambiguation)